The 2014 FIM CEV Moto3 International Championship was the third CEV Moto3 season and the first under the FIM banner. Fabio Quartararo successfully defended his championship by winning nine out of the eleven races. By winning the championship, he secured himself a ride in Moto3 for 2015 – despite being under the minimum age limit – following a rule change in August 2014. Other race winners were María Herrera at Jerez, and series runner up Jorge Navarro at Albacete; Quartararo finished second in both races. Hiroki Ono finished the season in third place with four podiums.

Calendar

Championship standings

Scoring system
Points are awarded to the top fifteen finishers. A rider has to finish the race to earn points.

Riders' Championships

Constructors' Championship

Entry list

References

External links

FIM CEV Moto3 Junior World Championship
CEV Moto3
CEV Moto3